Sergejs Seņins (born April 16, 1972) is a retired Latvian professional ice hockey player.

Playing career
Seņins began his professional career in Dinamo Riga, however he played most of his games for Dinamo successor Pārdaugava Rīga. Where he played for tree seasons through 1992-93 to 1994-95. For most of his career he played outside Latvia, mostly in Denmark.

International
Seņins made national team roster for World Championships on two occasions in 1997 and 2000 and in 2002 Winter Olympics.

Career statistics

Regular season and playoffs

International

References

External links 

1972 births
Living people
Latvian ice hockey right wingers
ASK/Ogre players
Dinamo Riga players
EC Peiting players
Frederikshavn White Hawks players
Haifa Hawks players
Herning Blue Fox players
HK Liepājas Metalurgs players
HK Riga 2000 players
Ice hockey players at the 2002 Winter Olympics
Olympic ice hockey players of Latvia
Severstal Cherepovets players
Soviet ice hockey right wingers
Trondheim Black Panthers players
Latvian expatriate ice hockey people
Latvian expatriate sportspeople in Russia
Expatriate ice hockey players in Russia
Latvian expatriate sportspeople in Denmark
Expatriate ice hockey players in Denmark
Latvian expatriate sportspeople in Germany
Expatriate ice hockey players in Germany
Latvian expatriate sportspeople in Sweden
Expatriate ice hockey players in Sweden
Latvian expatriate sportspeople in Norway
Expatriate ice hockey players in Norway
Latvian expatriate sportspeople in Estonia
Expatriate ice hockey players in Estonia
Latvian expatriate sportspeople in Israel
Expatriate ice hockey players in Israel